Muhammed Shanil (born 20 December 1988) is an Indian-born cricketer who played for the United Arab Emirates national cricket team. He was selected as the captain of the United Arab Emirates cricket team for their three-match List A series against Oman in October 2016, making his List A debut in the process. He made his Twenty20 International (T20I) debut for the United Arab Emirates against Afghanistan on 18 December 2016.

References

External links
 

1988 births
Living people
People from Kozhikode district
Emirati cricketers
United Arab Emirates Twenty20 International cricketers
Cricketers from Kerala
Indian emigrants to the United Arab Emirates
Indian expatriate sportspeople in the United Arab Emirates